The 1940 United States Senate election in Maine was held on September 9, 1940. 

Incumbent Republican Senator Frederick Hale did not run for re-election. Republican U.S. Representative and former Governor Owen Brewster won the open seat, defeating two Governors of Maine: incumbent Republican Governor Lewis Barrows in the primary and former Democratic Governor Louis Brann in the general election.

Republican primary

Candidates
 Lewis O. Barrows, Governor of Maine
 Owen Brewster, U.S. Representative from Dexter and former Governor (1925–29)

Results

Democratic primary

Candidates
 Louis J. Brann, former Governor of Maine (1933–37)

Results
Brann was unopposed for the Democratic nomination.

General election

Results

See also 
 1940 United States Senate elections

References 

1940
Maine
United States Senate